Fifteen ships of the French Navy have borne the name Minerve, in honour of the Greek goddess Minerva.

Ships named Minerve 
 , a 26-gun frigate, lead ship of her class (1757–1762)
 , a 32-gun frigate (1778–1781) 
 , a 32-gun , was started as Minerve
 , a 40-gun frigate, lead ship of her class (1782–1794)
 , a 16-gun corvette (1794–1795), bore the name
 , a 40-gun frigate (1794–1809)
 , a 58-gun ship of the line (1797–1799)
 , a 40-gun frigate, was started as Minerve
 , a 44-gun  (1805–1806)
 , a 44-gun frigate (1806–1814)
 , a captured Portuguese 48-gun frigate (1809–1810)
 , a 32-gun frigate (1836–1874)
 , a steam frigate of the 
 , a submarine of the FNFL (1936–1946)

See also
 
 Minerva (disambiguation)

Notes and references

Notes

References

Bibliography 
 
 

French Navy ship names